Gretna is an unincorporated community in Logan County, in the U.S. state of Ohio.

History
A post office was established at Gretna in 1878, and remained in operation until 1901. Besides the post office, Gretna had a railroad station and country store.

References

Unincorporated communities in Logan County, Ohio
1878 establishments in Ohio
Populated places established in 1878
Unincorporated communities in Ohio